Euthrenopsis bountyensis is a species of marine gastropod mollusc in the family Buccinidae. It was first described by Baden Powell in 1929. It is endemic to the waters of New Zealand.

Description

Euthrenopsis bountyensis has a shell with six whorls, with strong and even convex outlines. The species measures 9mm by 4mm.

Distribution
The species is Endemic to New Zealand. The holotype and juvenile paratypes were collected from the Bounty Islands. A similar specimen was collected from the waters of the Antipodes Islands in 1967.

References

 Spencer, H.G., Marshall, B.A. & Willan, R.C. (2009). Checklist of New Zealand living Mollusca. Pp 196-219. in: Gordon, D.P. (ed.) New Zealand inventory of biodiversity. Volume one. Kingdom Animalia: Radiata, Lophotrochozoa, Deuterostomia. Canterbury University Press,

Buccinidae
Gastropods described in 1929
Gastropods of New Zealand
Endemic fauna of New Zealand
Endemic molluscs of New Zealand
Molluscs of the Pacific Ocean
Taxa named by Arthur William Baden Powell